Clarence Eugene "Hank" Snow (May 9, 1914 – December 20, 1999) was a Canadian-American country music artist. Most popular in the 1950s, he had a career that spanned more than 50 years.  He recorded 140 albums and charted more than 85 singles on the Billboard country charts from 1950 until 1980. His number-one hits include the self-penned songs  "I'm Moving On", "The Golden Rocket", and  "The Rhumba Boogie"; and  famous versions of "I Don't Hurt Anymore", "Let Me Go, Lover!", "I've Been Everywhere", "Hello Love", as well as other top 10 hits.

Snow was an accomplished songwriter whose clear, baritone voice expressed a wide range of emotions including the joys of freedom and travel as well as the anguish of tortured love. His music was rooted in his beginnings in small-town Nova Scotia where, as a frail,  youngster, he endured extreme poverty, beatings and psychological abuse as well as physically punishing labour during the Great Depression. Through it all, his musically talented mother provided the emotional support he needed to pursue his dream of becoming a famous entertainer like his idol, the country star, Jimmie Rodgers.

As a performer of traditional country music, Snow won numerous awards and is a member of the Country Music Hall of Fame, the Canadian Country Music Hall of Fame and the Canadian Music Hall of Fame. The Hank Snow Museum in Liverpool, Nova Scotia celebrates his life and work in a province where his fans still see him as an inspirational figure who triumphed over personal adversity to become one of the most influential artists in all of country music.

Early life
Hank Snow was the son of George Snow (1886-1966)  and Maude Marie Hatt (1889-1953) in the small community of Brooklyn in Queens County, Nova Scotia, Canada.  He was born on May 9, 1914. He was the fifth of six children, of whom the two eldest died in infancy. His parents were married on November 10, 1909, in Liverpool, Nova Scotia.  After divorcing his father, Hank's mother married Charles Tanner in 1930. In his autobiography, Snow tells how his parents struggled to feed their four remaining children during hard financial times. George Snow worked for low pay as a foreman in sawmills, often far from home, while Marie helped support the family by washing clothes and scrubbing floors in better-off homes. Both parents showed musical talent. Although Snow says his father loved to sing "in an amateurish way", he describes his mother as "an accomplished singer" who played piano during silent films at the local theatre and sometimes performed in minstrel shows. She also enjoyed playing her own pump organ, but refused several offers to join travelling shows because of her dedication to the family.

His parents legally separated when he was about eight and the local Overseer of the Poor decided the children should be taken from their mother because of her inability to support them financially. One sister moved in with an aunt, while the other two were sent to separate foster homes. Snow himself went to live with his paternal grandmother who ordered him never to mention his mother's name and subjected him to severe beatings as well as psychological abuse. Gradually, Snow began to sneak away to visit his mother in nearby Liverpool and eventually, after his grandmother failed in her attempt to get him sent to reform school, he was allowed to rejoin his mother.

Musical beginnings
After his mother's remarriage to local fisherman Charles Tanner, who as a talented folk carver later went on to become a well-known artist in his own right, she ordered a Hawai'ian steel guitar advertised in a magazine along with free lessons and several 78 rpm gramophone records. At first, she ordered her son not to touch the guitar because it was one of her prized possessions, but later, when she finally allowed him to play, she marveled at the various sounds that he could get from the instrument. After he had mastered some chords and a few songs, his mother would ask him to sing and play for her. When he performed for the neighbours, word got around and he was then being invited out somewhere just about every night. So it was through his mother's mail-order guitar that he became interested in music.

Life at sea

In 1926, Snow found work by joining a fishing schooner where he served as a "flunky" or cabin boy. The job did not pay any wages. Snow, however, was allowed to cut out cod tongues and sell them later along with any fish he caught from the deck. After one trip, he sold his tongues and fish for around $58.  Feeling rich, he ordered a guitar and chord book for $5.95 from the T. Eaton mail-order catalogue. In 1927 or 1928, Snow remembers hearing radio broadcasts while at sea. The one-hour broadcasts featured recordings by such country artists as Vernon Dalhart and Carson Robison. "I still remember Dalhart singing 'The Prisoner's Song,' and 'The Wreck of the Old 97,'" Snow recalls. "These songs gave me a great lift." He adds that he tried to sing the songs exactly as the artists had, entertaining his fellow crew members by singing and dancing while accompanying himself on a mouth organ.

Snow's fishing trips went well until August 1930, when the schooner he was sailing on got caught in ferocious winds that blew it uncontrollably toward Sable Island, known as the "Graveyard of the Atlantic" because the crews of ships wrecked there rarely survived. Snow writes that when they were about 14 miles from the island, "the Good Lord reached out his Hand and changed the wind. Saved by the grace of God!" A day later, Snow learned that six other vessels had been lost in the gale and that 132 men had drowned. Once ashore in Canso, Snow vowed he would never return to the open sea again. "I was finished," he writes. "No more fishing trips for me."

Life after sailing

Snow returned to live with his mother and stepfather, again without holding down steady work. Instead, he attempted to get by just peddling fish door-to-door or landing occasional jobs that included transporting  passengers and their luggage by horse-drawn buggy to and from the train station in Lunenburg; unloading salt and coal ships; raking scallops and hauling loads of dried cod into a warehouse for processing and shipping. One winter, after being reunited with his father, he cut pulpwood and firewood on his father's farm in the backwoods at Pleasantville.

On September 2, 1935, he married Minnie Blanche Aalders, a young Halifax woman, born in Kentville, Nova Scotia, who worked in a local chocolate factory. She soon became pregnant and gave birth to their only child, Jimmie Rodgers Snow.

Career

Early music career
At one point, Snow spotted a picture of a guitar for $12.95 in Eaton's catalogue. He figured he could sell his old guitar for five dollars, but - since he still wasn't working -
wondered how he would raise the additional $7.95. The answer came when a storeowner in the village of Blue Rocks, hired him to paint yellow pinstripes on the wooden spokes of his brand new car. He offered to pay Snow two dollars per wheel. After the new guitar arrived, Snow experimented by playing runs and chord progressions in the style of Jimmie Rodgers. He also sang and played in an old fishhouse where local men stored their gear. Soon, Snow was invited to perform in a minstrel show in Bridgewater to help raise money for charity. "Someone blackened my face with black polish and put white rings around my eyes and lips," Snow recalls. When his turn came in the show, he played a song called "I Went to See My Gal Last Night." "My debut was a big success," Snow writes. "I even got a standing ovation."

In March 1933, Snow wrote to Halifax radio station CHNS asking for an audition. The rejection letter he received only made him more determined and later that year he visited the station, was given an audition and hired to do a Saturday evening show that was advertised as "Clarence Snow and his Guitar." After a few months, he adopted the name "The Cowboy Blue Yodeler" in homage to his idol Jimmie Rodgers known as "America's Blue Yodeler." Since Snow's Saturday show had no sponsor, he wasn't paid for his performances, but he did manage to earn money playing halls and clubs in towns where people had heard him on the radio. He also played in Halifax theatres before the movies started and performed, for $10 a week, on a CHNS musical show sponsored by a company that manufactured a popular laxative. At the urging of the station's chief engineer and announcer, he adopted the name Hank because it went well with cowboy songs and once again, influenced by Jimmie Rodgers, he became "Hank, The Yodeling Ranger." Snow also appeared occasionally on the CBC's regional network.

Canadian years

Snow's audition with the Canadian division of RCA Victor in Montreal, Quebec, on October 29, 1936, led to a recording contract and the release of his first record with "The Prisoned Cowboy" coupled with "Lonesome Blue Yodel". Snow spent his entire career with RCA Victor, recording for the label until 1981. A weekly CBC radio show brought him national recognition and, he began touring Canada until the late 1940s when American country music stations began playing his records.

Nashville
Snow moved to Nashville, Tennessee, in 1949, and "Hank Snow, the Singing Ranger" (modified from his earlier nickname, the Yodeling Ranger), made his first records in the United States for RCA Victor in 1949. His first US release, "Marriage Vow", climbed to number ten on the country charts in the fall of 1949; However, it wasn't until he was invited to play at the Grand Ole Opry in 1950 that he gained serious significance in the United States. His second release in early 1950, "I'm Moving On", was the first of seven number-one hits on the country charts. "I'm Moving On" stayed at the top for 21 weeks, setting the all-time record for most weeks at number one.

That same year "The Golden Rocket" and "The Rhumba Boogie" both hit number one with the latter remaining No. 1 for eight weeks.

Along with these hits, his other "signature song" was "I've Been Everywhere", in which he portrayed himself as a hitchhiker bragging about all the towns he'd been through. This song was originally written and performed in Australia by Geoff Mack, and its re-write incorporated North American place names. Rattling off a well-rhymed series of city names at an auctioneer's pace has long made the song a challenge for any singer.

While performing in Renfro Valley, Snow worked with a young Hank Williams.

In the February 7, 1953, edition, Billboard Magazine reported that Snow's then-17-year-old son, Jimmie Rodgers Snow, had signed with RCA Victor and that the younger Snow would "record duets with his father", as well as cover his own material.

Rainbow Ranch
Snow bought a ranch home in Madison, Tennessee (1951) shortly after he experienced success with two songs, "I've Been Everywhere" and "I'm Movin' On." He named the home 'Rainbow Ranch' after his band, which was known as the "Rainbow Ranch Boys". In recent years the home has been restored by Snow's family. The home was added to the National Register of Historic Places listings in Davidson County, Tennessee on November 27, 2018.

Elvis Presley
A regular at the Grand Ole Opry, in 1954 Snow persuaded the directors to allow a young Elvis Presley to appear on stage. Snow used Presley as his opening act and introduced him to Colonel Tom Parker. In August 1955, Snow and Parker formed the management team, Hank Snow Attractions. This partnership signed a management contract with Presley but before long, Snow was out and Parker had full control over the rock singer's career. Forty years after leaving Parker, Snow stated, "I have worked with several managers over the years and have had respect for them all except one. Tom Parker [Snow refused to recognize the honorary title "Colonel"] was the most egotistical, obnoxious human being I've ever had dealings with."

Later career
Performing in lavish and colourful sequin-studded suits, Snow had a career covering six decades during which he sold more than 80 million albums. Although he became an American naturalized citizen in 1958, he still maintained friendships in Canada and remembered his roots with the 1968 album, My Nova Scotia Home.

Despite his lack of schooling, Snow was a gifted songwriter and in 1978 was elected to the Nashville Songwriters Hall of Fame. In Canada, he was ten times voted that country's top country music performer. In 1979, he was elected to the Country Music Hall of Fame, the Canadian Music Hall of Fame and the Nova Scotia Music Hall of Fame. He was also inducted into the Canadian Country Music Hall of Fame in 1985.

His autobiography, The Hank Snow Story, was published in 1994, and later The Hank Snow Country Music Centre opened near his ancestral home in Liverpool, Nova Scotia. A victim of child abuse, he established the Hank Snow International Foundation For Prevention Of Child Abuse.

Illness and death
In 1996, Snow began experiencing respiratory problems which forced him to retire from performing. He died three years later on December 20, 1999 , at his Rainbow Ranch in Madison, Tennessee, at age 85, and was interred in Nashville's Spring Hill Cemetery. His wife Minnie died on May 12, 2003, in Madison, Tennessee.

Legacy

Elvis Presley, The Rolling Stones, Ray Charles, Ashley MacIsaac, Johnny Cash and Emmylou Harris, among others, have covered his music.

One of his last top hits, "Hello Love", was sung by Garrison Keillor to open each broadcast of his Prairie Home Companion radio show.  The song became Snow's seventh and final number 1 hit on the Billboard Hot Country Singles chart in April 1974. At 59 years and 11 months, Snow became the oldest country artist to have a top song on the chart. (The record for oldest artist was Louis Armstrong in 1963 for Hello Dolly.) It was an accomplishment that Snow  held for more than 26 years, until Kenny Rogers's hit record in May 2000 (at 61 years and nine months), "Buy Me a Rose".  (Dolly Parton and Willie Nelson subsequently reached the top of the chart at older ages as secondary duet partners on records fronted by other artists.)

In Robert Altman's 1975 film Nashville, Henry Gibson played a self-obsessed country star loosely based on Hank Snow. Snow is played by Australian actor David Wenham in Baz Luhrmann's Elvis.

Snow is referenced in the opening lines of Jimmy Buffett's 1974 song "The Wino and I Know."

The character of Heikki Lunta, a fictitious Finnish snow god in the local culture of Michigan's Upper Peninsula, is named from the Finnish translation of Hank Snow. Heikki Lunta's mythology and songs—to sing, dance, and bring large amounts of snow, or to do the reverse and melt it—were invented and popularized by WMPL DJ David Riutta in Hancock, Michigan in 1970.

Discography

See also

Music of Canada
List of best-selling music artists

References

Bibliography
Wolfe, Charles. (1998). "Hank Snow". In The Encyclopedia of Country Music. Paul Kingsbury, Editor. New York: Oxford University Press. pp. 494–5.

External links
 
 Hank Snow at the Country Music Hall of Fame
 
 
 Article at thecanadianencyclopedia.ca
 Second article at thecanadianencyclopedia.ca
 Hank Snow Tribute Song
 Rev. Jimmie Rodgers Snow Ministries
 

1914 births
1999 deaths
American male composers
American male songwriters
Canadian Music Hall of Fame inductees
Canadian country singer-songwriters
Canadian emigrants to the United States
Country Music Hall of Fame inductees
Musicians from Nova Scotia
People from Queens County, Nova Scotia
Grand Ole Opry members
RCA Records Nashville artists
Burials in Tennessee
Yodelers
20th-century American singers
20th-century Canadian male singers
20th-century American composers
20th-century American male singers
Naturalized citizens of the United States
Canadian male singer-songwriters